Pendyala Nageswara Rao (6 March 1917 – 31 August 1984), known mononymously by his surname Pendyala, was an Indian composer, multi-instrumentalist, conductor, music producer known for his works predominantly in Telugu cinema along with Tamil and Kannada films.

Early life and career
He was born at Vanukuru near Vijayawada and later shifted to Katur. He was closely associated with Mikkilineni as they were students of Kapilavai Ramanatha Sastry.

His ancestors including his father Sitaramaiah were music exponents. Similarly Nageswara Rao also showed interest in music since childhood. He used to accompany his father playing Harmonium for dramas and learned techniques to play with it since the age of 13 years. He acted for the first time as Jambavati in Krishna Tulabharam play. He later played Rukmini, Narada characters in Tulabaram play along with Jonnavitula Sheshagiri, Rshyendramani, Lakshmirajyam and got the applause of the viewers.

During that period Kadaru Nagabhushanam seeing his talents, invited to him to work in his orchestra for Talli Prema (1941) film. He went to Madras and joined Rajarajeswari Films and worked as assistant director to Dinakar Rao and S V Venkataraman for that film. With the beginning of Second World War he returned home. Later he was invited by Gudavalli Ramabrahmam to work for Mayalokam as Harmonist under Gali Penchala Narasimha Rao. K. S. Prakash Rao gave him the independent music director change for his film Drohi, which brought him good fame. He has provided music for about 100 films some of them are memorable hits.

Pendyala is "Bhinna Sangeeta Sampradaya Vishesha Praveenajnudu" (Expert in Natakam Padya,Gadya aalaapana(Drama Poetry singing),Hari Katha,Burra Katha,Janapada/Lok Sangeet)) in addition to traditional Hindustani and Carnatic music styles.
Pendyala Composition for Kalidasa Poem "Manikya Veena Mupaalalayanti" in 1960 film Mahakavi Kalidasu , and "Jayeebhava Vijayeebhava" from 1977 film Daana Veera Soora Karna are few examples to measure his calibre.
Pendyala composed "Shringar Ras" (Romantic Duet) "Chitram Hai Bhalare Vichitram" Song for Character Duryodhana from Daana Veera Soora Karna film without hampering his Monarchy "Roudra Ras" for which he is known for. Rare combination made reality.
Pendyala tune for "Evaro Vastaarani Edo Chestarani" song from film Bhoomi Kosam aimed at social message and equality philosophy,but in a different unique tone from regular mode.
His Versatality is visible in song "Naa Peru Bikari Naa Daari Edaari" from 1976 film "Shri Rajeshwari Vilas Coffee Club" as with simple Harmonium he could elevate scene mood and character.

Pendyala would always follow norms,rules of Raga's basis time and situation of song in his film compositions. Similar to song "San Sanna Sanna Sanna, Jao Re O Pavan" from film Sampoorna Ramayana which was composed in Raga chandrakauns depicting isolation,loneliness (intended situation for Raga chandrakauns) of Sita at Ashoka vanam in Lanka,

Pendyala always respected Raga Lakshanam (Properties) in his compositions.
Always used appropriate Raga's for his tunes.
His Composition "Sivasankari Sivanandalahari" from film Jagadeka Veeruni Katha composed in Raga Darbari Kanada justifies time and situation for that raga which remained magnanimous all time hit in film compositions.
Pendyala had kept faith in an Idiom "Raasi kante Vaasi mendu" (Reputation is important/better than numbers).
People also had laid their belief in an Idiom "Gangi Govu Ksheeramu Garitadaina Chalunu" (Holy Cow Milk a Spoonful is Enough)

Filmography

References

External links
 

Telugu film score composers
Kannada film score composers
1917 births
1984 deaths
Indian male film actors
Tamil film score composers
Telugu playback singers
20th-century Indian male actors
Film musicians from Andhra Pradesh
20th-century Indian composers
20th-century Indian singers
Indian male film score composers
20th-century Indian male singers